CPS2 may refer to:

 CP System II, the Capcom Play System 2
 Carbamoyl Phosphate Synthase II, the rate-limiting enzyme of pyrimidine biosynthesis
 Keene/Elmhirst's Resort Airport, Transport Canada airport code CPS2
 Control Performance Standard 2, North American Electric Reliability Corporation Frequency Control Performance Measure